Ben Wells (born January 9, 1989) is an American football defensive back who is currently a free agent. He first enrolled at the University of Texas before transferring to Stephen F. Austin State University. He attended Ozen High School in Beaumont, Texas. Wells has been a member of the Washington Redskins, Montreal Alouettes and Arizona Rattlers.

Early years
Wells participated in football, basketball and track and field at Ozen High School. He was named first-team 4A all-state by the Associated Press and Texas Sports Writers Association his senior year. He played in the 2007 Offense-Defense All-American Bowl. He also earned first-team 22-4A all-district and first-team All-Greater Houston honors as a junior. Wells started his prep career as a wide receiver before switching to defense his junior year. He was the #88 ranked player nationally by Rivals.com in 2007.

College career
Wells played for the Texas Longhorns from 2008 to 2009. He was redshirted in 2007. He transferred to Stephen F. Austin State University and played for the Stephen F. Austin Lumberjacks from 2010 to 2011.

Professional career

Washington Redskins
Wells signed with the Washington Redskins of the National Football League (NFL) on April 29, 2012 after going undrafted in the 2012 NFL Draft.

Montreal Alouettes
Wells signed a two-year contract with the Montreal Alouettes of the Canadian Football League on May 13, 2013. He was released by the Alouettes on June 11, 2014.

Arizona Rattlers
Wells was signed by the Arizona Rattlers of the Arena Football League on September 25, 2014. On March 22, 2016, Wells was placed on reassignment.

References

External links
Just Sports Stats
NFL Draft Scout

Living people
1989 births
American football defensive backs
Canadian football defensive backs
African-American players of American football
African-American players of Canadian football
Texas Longhorns football players
Stephen F. Austin Lumberjacks football players
Washington Redskins players
Montreal Alouettes players
Arizona Rattlers players
Players of American football from Texas
Sportspeople from Beaumont, Texas
21st-century African-American sportspeople
20th-century African-American people